The A. Kasteyev State Museum of Arts is the largest art museum in Kazakhstan, located in Almaty.

The museum opened on 16 September 1976, based on the collections of the Shevchenko Kazakh State Gallery (established in 1935) and the Republic Museum of Decorative and Applied Art (established in 1970). In 1984, the museum was renamed to honour the Kazakh artist Abilkhan Kasteev (1904–1973).

The museum has a collection of over 23,000 works, including historic and contemporary Kazakhstan art, works from the Soviet era (1920s–1990s), Russian artworks (17th to early 20th century), Western European art (16th–20th centuries), and art from East Asia (China, India, Japan, and Korea).

The Kasteyev museum is especially noted for its collection of late works of distinguished sculptor Isaac Itkind and Kazakh painting and sculpture, likely to be the largest in the world, including works by N. Nurmukhammedov, M. Kim, K. Yeserkeyev, K. Mullashev, T. Abuov and Y. Tolepbai.

History
In 1935, an exhibition called "The 15th anniversary of the formation of the Kazakh SSR" was organized by the Kazakh State Art Gallery (since 1935  - named after TG Shevchenko ). The gallery carried out work on the collection of works by Kazakh, Russian and foreign artists. 

In 1970, the Museum of Folk Applied Art of Kazakhstan was organized, which collected, preserved, studied and promoted the products of Kazakh folk arts and crafts.

In 1976, the State Museum of Arts of the Kazakh SSR was established on the basis of the collections of the Kazakh State Art Gallery named after TG Shevchenko and the Museum of Applied Folk Art of Kazakhstan. Since the same year is located in a modern building (architect G. Novikov). 

In 1982 the building of the museum was included in the list of historical and cultural monuments of the Kazakh SSR of republican significance and taken under state protection.

In 1984, the museum was named after the Kazakh artist, the founder of the Kazakh national school of painting Abilkhan (Abylkhana) Kasteev .

See also
 List of museums in Kazakhstan
 National Museum of the Republic of Kazakhstan

References

External links
 Museum website

1976 establishments in the Kazakh Soviet Socialist Republic
Museums established in 1976
Art museums and galleries in Kazakhstan
Buildings and structures in Almaty
Museums in Almaty